Dinoplax is a genus of chitons in the family Chaetopleuridae. They are marine molluscs.

Taxonomy
Species in this genus include:
 Dinoplax chelazziana (Ferreira, 1983)
 Dinoplax fossus Sykes, 1899
 Dinoplax gigas (Gmelin, 1791)
 Dinoplax validifossus Ashby, 1934

References

Chaetopleuridae
Chiton genera